Dunchon-dong is a dong, neighbourhood of Gangdong-gu in Seoul, South Korea.

See also 
Administrative divisions of South Korea

References

External links
Gangdong-gu official website
Gangdong-gu map at the Gangdong-gu official website
 Gangdong-gu map
 The Dunchon 1 dong Resident office

Neighbourhoods of Gangdong District